Thornburg Investment Management is a US-based private, independent investment management company.  , it had assets under management and advisement totaling over US$ 46 billion. It was founded in 1982 by Garrett Thornburg and is headquartered in Santa Fe, New Mexico with additional offices in London, Hong Kong, and Shanghai.

History 
In 1982, American investor Garrett Thornburg established Thornburg Investment Management in Santa Fe, New Mexico. The company began by managing mutual funds. It launched the Limited Term Municipal Fund in 1984, the Thornburg Value Fund in 1995 and the International Value Fund in 1998.

In 2015, the company launched Thornburg Better World International Fund. The fund is based on ESG investing and as of September 2018, its three-year performance ranked in the sixth percentile of Morningstar, Inc.’s rating based on its risk-adjusted return.

Overview 
Thornburg Investment Management is an employee-owned firm offering mutual funds, institutional accounts, separate accounts for high-net-worth investors, and UCITS funds for non-U.S. investors. It manages eight equity mutual funds, one alternative mutual fund, and 11 fixed-income funds for individual and institutional clients, as of 2019 media reports. The company has clients in Australia, Japan, Canada, Switzerland, and all over the United States.

Thornburg Investment Management has US $46 billion under management and advisement and employs 250 people, as of January 2020.

Recognition 
In 2008, Thornburg Investment Management won a Lipper Award for best large fixed-income group. It was named Philanthropist of the Year by Journal North and the St. Vincent Hospital Foundation in 2017. The Thornburg Investment Income Builder Fund was awarded the 2019 Lipper Fund Award in the United Kingdom.

References 

1982 establishments in New Mexico
Financial services companies established in 1982
Investment management companies of the United States
Companies based in Santa Fe, New Mexico